The legal aid system in New Zealand provides government-funded legal assistance to those who are unable to afford a lawyer. Legal aid is available for almost all court actions across all levels of the court system. This includes criminal charges, civil issues, family disputes, appeals and Waitangi Tribunal claims. Since its inception, the cost of the service to the taxpayer has grown considerably. In 2009, the system was subject to a three-month critical review by Dame Margaret Bazley who suggested a number of changes including fixed fees for defence lawyers working on criminal cases. Bazley's recommendations were rapidly adopted by the government which wanted to cut costs. Leading academics have expressed concerns that, as a result, a New Zealander's right to a fair trial is being compromised.

History

New Zealand judges have long had the power to assign counsel, but following the Westminster Poor Prisoners Defence Act 1903, there were moves to introduce a similar act in New Zealand. This came in the form of the Justices of Peaces Amendment Act 1912 which made legal aid available for criminal offences. The Legal Aid Act 1939 (No 42) "authorized the New Zealand Law Society to establish committees and panels of legal practitioners for the assistance of poor persons", and gave the Governor-General the ability to introduce regulations surrounding the definition of a "poor person". Although no new regulations were introduced, in practice, the law profession provided legal aid to those who members of the public who required it. Applications went to the local District Law Society and if their application was accepted, the District Law Society would arrange for a lawyer to represent them.

The processes surrounding the provision of legal aid for criminal cases were more clearly elucidated by the Offenders Legal Aid Act 1954. This gave authority to "any Court having jurisdiction in criminal proceedings may, in respect of any stage of any criminal proceedings and in accordance with this Act, direct that legal aid be granted to any person charged with or convicted of any offence, if in its opinion it is desirable in the interests of justice to do so". The court would then assign a lawyer, who was paid at the "going rate" – the same as what he or she would be paid, should they have been representing the prosecution.

The Legal Aid Act 1969 (No 47) removed responsibility for legal aid from the Law Society by establishing the "Legal Aid Board". The board's functions included managing the day-to-day functioning of the legal aid scheme, overseeing the work of District Legal Aid Committees, guaranteeing that the legal aid system was efficient, making recommendations to the Minister of Justice as required, and completing other functions that the Board may be asked to carry out. The act also outlined the circumstances in which legal aid may be refused or withdrawn, based on a means test, with the intention of making aid 'more readily available for persons of small or moderate means'. The Act also established a Legal Aid Appeal Authority which the solicitor applying for aid could appeal to if the application was declined by the Board.

The Legal Services Act 1991 repealed previous legislation and ensured that legal aid was available for both civil and criminal cases. At the same time, it widened the proceedings for which legal aid may be awarded and, for the first time, made legal aid available for Waitangi Tribunal claims. The Legal Services Act 2000 further extended the availability of legal aid to cover proceedings in the Environment Court, actions relating to leaky buildings brought under the Weathertight Homes Resolution Services Act 2006, and New Zealand Parole Board hearings.

Increasing costs 

The income criteria for accessing legal aid remained unchanged since 1969. But incomes and legal costs continued to rise with the result that more and more people on low incomes were being shut out of the system. Despite the lack of access, the cost of legal aid continued to grow; in 2003 the legal aid bill rose to $100 million.

In 2005 the Minister of Justice, Phil Goff, announced that income thresholds would also be raised to allow a wider range of low income-earners access to legal representation. Introducing the Legal Services Amendment Bill in Parliament, Mr Goff said the new thresholds "will be fairer to lower-income working families who are currently disadvantaged in relation to those dependent on benefits." 
1.2 million people were estimated to qualify for legal aid under the new thresholds. With more and more people accessing the system, costs continued to grow and in 2006/07 it reached $111 million. In 2009/10 it ballooned to $173 million.

Waitangi Tribunal costs 
Waitangi Tribunal claims have been a contributing factor to the growing cost of legal aid as Treaty claimants can apply for legal aid irrespective of their financial circumstances – which is not the case in civil or criminal cases. Since 2006, Waitangi tribunal cases have cost the taxpayer $79 million in legal aid, although as at January 2013, there were 780 claims still outstanding.41% of the 75 most expensive cases were Treaty claims in 2008-2009. In 2012, about 8% of the $148 million legal aid bill was spent on treaty claims.

The Law society says Treaty cases should be funded separately from other legal aid work. Former Law Society president, Jonathan Temm, says: "Legal aid was never really intended to fund the kind of demand that the Waitangi Tribunal work was making and it's skewing the figures..."

High profile cases 

A forensic accountant engaged by the Criminal Bar Association found that the cost of legal aid is boosted by the 1% of high-profile criminal cases which account for 27% of the total legal aid bill. For instance, the legal aid bill for David Bain's case, which went on for 13 years, was over $3 million. Nearly $4 million was spent defending the 18 people arrested in the Urewera terrorist raids.

The Bazley review 

In 2009, then Justice Minister Simon Power appointed an experienced public servant, Dame Margaret Bazley, to review the entire legal aid system after reports that it was being rorted by a small group of incompetent and unscrupulous lawyers. Her report, released in November of that year, said some lawyers were ill-prepared for cases and were "gaming" the system by delaying pleas to maximise legal aid payments. She said some lawyers were demanding "top-up" payments from clients on top of what they were getting from legal aid.

Dame Bazley also noted that legal aid is one of three government funding sources available to Waitangi Treaty claimants and recommended that modifications should be made to the way that legal aid is paid to these claimants to prevent double dipping.

Recent developments

Expansion of Public Defence Service 

Initially, the Public Defence Service (PDS) employed a limited number of lawyers operating in courts in Auckland on a salary, instead of paying private lawyers for these cases. It began as a pilot scheme in May 2004. In response to Dame Bazley's review, and in an attempt to keep the cost of legal aid under $100 million a year, then Justice Minister Simon Power announced a series of changes including an expansion of the PDS to take on 50 per cent of criminal legal aid cases.

Lawyers employed by the PDS are employed directly by the government, whereas private lawyers not employed by the PDS may still provide legal aid representation, so long as they meet the criteria described under the act. PDS and private sector legal aid lawyers are still paid from the same legal aid budget. However, the PDS is only available in New Zealand's busiest courts, where there are enough legal cases to justify the existence of both the PDS and the private bar. By 2012 the service had expanded to include courts in Wellington, Lower Hutt, Porirua, Hamilton, Dunedin and Tauranga. The most recent PDS office to open was in Hawkes Bay in May 2012.

Administrative changes 
Other changes implemented in response to the Bazley review included:
 tightening up eligibility criteria and extending the existing thresholds for family and civil cases ($22,000 a year for a single adult and $50,934 for an adult with two dependents) to criminal cases.
 the introduction of fixed fees for legal aid, rather than allowing lawyers to charge by the hour.
 the reintroduction of a user charge ($100 – later reduced to $50) and interest to be charged on all legal aid debts to encourage speedy repayment
 lawyers to be assigned on a rotational basis so that offenders facing less serious charges (i.e. offences with a maximum sentence of less than 10 years imprisonment) can no longer select their own lawyer.

When Judith Collins became Justice Minister in 2011, she watered down some of Simon Power's proposals but left the fixed fees and rotational assignments unchanged. She also indicated she was "comfortable with the amount of money being spent on Treaty (of Waitangi) claims".

These legislative changes were not well received by the legal community. New Zealand Law Society President Jonathan Temm said legal aid was already underfunded and expanding the Public Defence Service would make the organisation even less efficient. In 2012 Justice Andrew Tipping, the country's longest-serving senior judge, said the recent cutbacks to legal aid had compromised the justice system: "The amount of money spent deciding whether legal aid should be granted by the Ministry of Justice would be better spent on legal representation."

Impact of funding cuts

On justice 

As a result of fixed fees and other measures, by 2014 the cost of legal aid had been cut by a third, dropping back to $102 million. University of Canterbury dean of law, Chris Gallavin, said the funding cuts and bureaucratic barriers meant "more lawyers were not bothering applying for legal aid, and more people were choosing to represent themselves rather than shoulder the cost of legal advice". Lawyers and academics said this was compromising New Zealander's right to a fair trial.

On domestic violence cases 
Solicitor Louise Taylor said that some of clients said "they've phoned up to 40 practitioners and are unable to find someone".

Legal Aid Providers 
In May 2017 LAPA (Legal Aid Providers Aotearoa) was launched, with 136 major providers invited to a summit in Christchurch, New Zealand.

LAPA's mission statement on their website is to "improve access to justice by delivering legal aid that is both profitable and of a high quality, through efficient systems and supportive professional relationships".

References

Society of New Zealand
Law of New Zealand
New Zealand